KDTP-LP, UHF analog channel 58, was a low-powered Jewelry Television-affiliated television station in Phoenix, Arizona, United States. The station was owned by the Daystar Television Network.

History
The original construction permit for low-power television station K58DV was granted to Atrium Broadcasting Company (later Venture Technologies Group, LLC) on August 21, 1990, with the transmitter to be located on South Mountain in Phoenix. The FCC granted the license on September 29, 1992. Originally, K58DV aired programming from The Box, a music video channel based in the UK. In February 1996, the station took the call letters KPHZ-LP.

In 2000, the station changed its programming to America's Collectibles Network, or ACN (now Jewelry Television). In September 2002, Venture Technologies Group sold KPHZ-LP to NBC Telemundo, along with stations KPHZ and KPSW-CA (now KTAZ and KPDF-CD, respectively). In June 2006, as part of the Telemundo/Daystar license swap, NBC Telemundo sold KPHZ-LP to Daystar, along with station KDRX-CA (now KDPH-LD). In August 2006, Daystar changed the station's call letters to KDTP-LP.

The station's license was cancelled by the Federal Communications Commission on March 17, 2016, after having been silent since December 31, 2011. Channel 58 is now used by former sister station KDPH-LD as a Jewelry Television affiliate, as KDTP-LP was prior to going off the air.

References

DTP-LP
Television channels and stations established in 1992
1992 establishments in Arizona
Defunct television stations in the United States
Television channels and stations disestablished in 2016
2016 disestablishments in Arizona